Anton Viktorovich Yelchin (March 11, 1989 – June 19, 2016) was an American actor. Born in the Soviet Union to a Russian Jewish family, he immigrated to the United States with his parents at the age of 6 months. He began his career as a child actor, appearing as the lead of the mystery drama film Hearts in Atlantis (2001) and a series regular on the Showtime comedy-drama Huff (2004–2006). Yelchin landed higher profile film roles in 2009, portraying Lieutenant Pavel Chekov in the Star Trek reboot and Kyle Reese in Terminator Salvation. He reprised his role as Chekov in the sequels Star Trek Into Darkness (2013) and Star Trek Beyond (2016).

Yelchin frequently worked on independent and lower profile films, headlining the romantic drama Like Crazy (2011), the 2011 remake of Fright Night, the supernatural thriller Odd Thomas (2013), the romance 5 to 7 (2014), the horror comedy Burying the Ex (2014), the neo noir The Driftless Area (2015), and the horror thriller Green Room (2015). As a voice actor, he voiced Clumsy Smurf in the live-action Smurfs films (2011–2013) and lead role of James "Jim" Lake Jr. on the Netflix series Trollhunters: Tales of Arcadia (2016–2018). He maintained an active career up until his accidental death in 2016 when he was fatally injured by his SUV.

Early life and education 
Yelchin was born on March 11, 1989, in Leningrad, Russian SFSR, Soviet Union. His parents, Irina Korina and Viktor Yelchin, were pair figure skaters who were stars of the Leningrad Ice Ballet for 15 years. His family is Jewish, and were subjected to religious and political oppression in the Soviet Union. Yelchin said that his grandparents "suffered in ways [he] can't even begin to understand under Stalin". Nationally, Yelchin's parents were the third-ranked pair team; they thus qualified for the 1972 Winter Olympics, but were not permitted to participate by the Soviet authorities. Yelchin said the reason was unclear: "I don't exactly know what that was – because they were Jewish or because the KGB didn't want them to travel."

Yelchin's family left for the United States in September 1989, when Anton was six months old, and were thereafter granted refugee status from the Department of State. His mother worked as a figure skating choreographer and his father as a figure skating coach, having been Sasha Cohen's first trainer. Yelchin's uncle is the children's author and painter Eugene Yelchin. In an article published in the Los Angeles Times in December 1989, Yelchin's mother stated, "A woman came up, saw Anton, and said, 'He's beautiful. He will be actor.'" Yelchin stated that he "wasn't very good" at figure skating, his parents' profession.

Yelchin was born with cystic fibrosis. However, details of his medical condition were only revealed posthumously in 2017 by a foundation established in his name, the Anton Yelchin Foundation.

Yelchin attended the Sherman Oaks Center for Enriched Studies in Tarzana, California, and enrolled at the University of Southern California in the fall of 2007 to study film.

Career
After his film debut in A Man Is Mostly Water, Yelchin's early roles in both film and television included Delivering Milo, Along Came a Spider, Taken, and House of D. Yelchin played Bobby Garfield in Hearts in Atlantis (2001), for which he received a Young Artist Award for Best Performance in a Feature Film: Leading Young Actor in 2002. 

In Showtime's television series Huff, Yelchin played Byrd Huffstodt, the 14-year-old son of the eponymous character (Hank Azaria). In 2004, he guest-starred in the Season Four episode of Curb Your Enthusiasm as Stewart, Cheryl David's cousin and a self-described magician who knows a card trick. In 2006, he guest-starred in the Law & Order: Criminal Intent episode "Tru Love", as a boy who falls in love with his teacher. He also appeared in the Criminal Minds episode "Sex, Birth & Death" as Nathan Harris, a boy who has murderous urges towards prostitutes and approaches Dr. Spencer Reid to help him before he actually does kill.

In Alpha Dog, Yelchin played Zack Mazursky, a character based on real-life murder victim Nicholas Markowitz. USA Todays review described Yelchin's performance as "heartbreakingly endearing". After the film's premiere, Markowitz's mother praised his portrayal of her son. Yelchin subsequently headlined Fierce People, which received a limited release on September 7, 2007. In 2008, he played the title role in Charlie Bartlett, a film about a wealthy teenager in a public high school. He also appeared alongside the Russian duo t.A.T.u. in the film You and I (which was filmed in Moscow during the summer of 2007), and co-starred in Middle of Nowhere.

Yelchin played supporting roles in two blockbuster films released in May 2009: Star Trek, in which he played teenage navigator Pavel Chekov, and Terminator Salvation, in which he played a young Kyle Reese.

In 2011, Yelchin played Charley Brewster in Craig Gillespie's remake film Fright Night, starred in the romantic drama Like Crazy, and voiced Clumsy Smurf in the film adaptation of The Smurfs and its sequel. He replaced Russell Tovey for the voice role of Albino Pirate in the American version of the animated film The Pirates! In an Adventure with Scientists! (also known as The Pirates! Band of Misfits) (2012). Yelchin voiced Shun in Studio Ghibli's From Up on Poppy Hill.

Yelchin again played the role of Chekov in the 2013 film Star Trek Into Darkness. He also played the lead in the thriller Odd Thomas (2013) as well as the horror comedy Burying the Ex and the romantic film 5 to 7 (both in 2014). In 2015, Yelchin starred in the independent horror film Green Room, which premiered at the Cannes film festival that year and received limited theatrical release in May 2016, and the neo noir film The Driftless Area.

Shortly before his death, Yelchin reprised his role as Chekov in Star Trek Beyond, which was released on July 22, 2016. He completed filming several independent films which were released posthumously. Yelchin also recorded the voice role of Jim in Guillermo del Toro's Trollhunters: Tales of Arcadia.

Personal life
Yelchin enjoyed playing guitar, which he said gave him fulfillment, and was a fan of acoustic blues music. He once played for a punk band called The Hammerheads.

He was also interested in photography.  In January 2018, an exhibit of Yelchin's photography entitled Anton Yelchin: Provocative Beauty was displayed at New York City's De Buck Gallery.  Yelchin's photography has since been critically acclaimed by various magazines around the world as exhibits continue.

Yelchin briefly dated his co-star Kristen Stewart when they were filming Fierce People; after his death, she described him as her "first heartbreak".

Death
After Yelchin failed to arrive at a rehearsal, he was found by friends after midnight on June 19, 2016, pinned between his Jeep Grand Cherokee and a brick pillar gate post outside his house in Studio City, Los Angeles, the victim of what was described as a "freak accident". As Yelchin got out of his car and went to check his locked gate and mail, the vehicle apparently rolled back down his driveway, which was on a steep incline, and trapped him against the pillar and a security fence. Yelchin was pronounced dead at the scene at the age of 27; the Los Angeles County Coroner's office identified the cause of death as "blunt traumatic asphyxia" and stated that there were "no obvious suspicious circumstances involved".

Tributes
Following Yelchin's death, the producers of Star Trek stated that the role of Chekov would not be recast and that the character would be written out of any subsequent Star Trek films. Star Trek Beyond was dedicated to Yelchin and Leonard Nimoy, who also died between the release of Star Trek Into Darkness and Star Trek Beyond. Smurfs: The Lost Village was dedicated to Yelchin, as he had provided the voice of Clumsy Smurf in the live-action Smurfs films. Additionally, We Don't Belong Here, Rememory, Porto, Newness, Thoroughbreds, and the first two episodes of Trollhunters are dedicated to him, with the entirety of Trollhunters being dedicated to him upon its conclusion in May 2018. Yelchin was also featured in the "In Memoriam" section during the 89th Academy Awards.

In October 2017, a bronze statue of Yelchin was erected at his grave in the Hollywood Forever Cemetery. Celebrities present at the unveiling ceremony included Jennifer Lawrence, Zoe Saldana, Simon Pegg, J. J. Abrams, Emile Hirsch, Demi Moore, Jon Voight, Drake Doremus, and Jeremy Saulnier. Saldana spoke at the ceremony, paying tribute to Yelchin: "It is a bittersweet moment, because we're here for Anton, and he's not here with us. But, it alleviates my heart knowing that we'll keep him alive. We're going to keep remembering him in the hope that by practicing all the things he believed in and remembering all the love that he gave us, and all the joy he gave us, we're able to just keep him here with us."

Yelchin was memorialized in the online video game, Star Trek Online. He received a memorial plaque alongside several other late Star Trek actors; such as Nimoy, James Doohan, and Star Trek creator Gene Roddenberry. A Starfleet vessel named "Yelchin" is mentioned twice in Star Trek: Discovery episode "Unification III" (S03E07) and again in the season four finale "Coming Home" (S04E13).

On January 28, 2019, Viktor and Irina Yelchin premiered a documentary about their son, Love, Antosha, at the 2019 Sundance Film Festival.

Lawsuit and recalls

Fiat Chrysler Automobiles (FCA), the manufacturer of the Grand Cherokee, was aware of 2014 and 2015 models having a high rate of rollaway incidents due to a gearshift design that could make it difficult for the driver to determine whether the vehicle was in park or still in gear. FCA had already recalled all 2014–15 Grand Cherokees for this concern in April 2016, but the software patch to repair the vehicles did not reach dealers until the week of Yelchin's death. Following his death, FCA accelerated the recall campaign and took steps to get the affected Jeeps repaired more quickly than originally planned.

On August 1, 2016, Yelchin's parents announced through their attorney that they were planning to file a wrongful death lawsuit against Fiat Chrysler. The dealership from which Yelchin purchased the vehicle stated that he was responsible for his own death, because he had allegedly "misused" and "modified" the vehicle. The dealer also asked to be removed from the lawsuit. On March 22, 2018, it was announced that Yelchin's family and Fiat Chrysler had confidentially settled out of court.

Filmography

Film

Television

Video games

Music videos

Accolades

See also
Davey Moore - American boxer who died in very similar circumstances

References

External links

 
 
 
 

1989 births
2016 deaths
20th-century American Jews
20th-century American male actors
21st-century American Jews
21st-century American male actors
Accidental deaths in California
American male child actors
American male film actors
American male television actors
American male video game actors
American male voice actors
American people of Russian-Jewish descent
Burials at Hollywood Forever Cemetery
Jewish American male actors
People from Studio City, Los Angeles
People with cystic fibrosis
Road incident deaths in California
Russian emigrants to the United States
University of Southern California alumni